The 2005–06 A1 Grand Prix of Nations, Mexico was an A1 Grand Prix race, held on the weekend of February 26, 2006 at the Fundidora Park Circuit.

Report

Practice

Qualifying

Sprint race

Main race

Results

Qualification 
Qualification took place on Saturday, February 25, 2006.

Sprint Race Results 
The Sprint Race took place on Sunday, February 26, 2006.

Main Race Results 
The Main Race took place on Sunday, February 26, 2006.

Total Points 

 Fastest Lap: A1 Team France (1'21.100 / 150.3 km/h, lap 17 of Main Race)

References

Mexico
A1 Grand Prix